Batyrevo is the name of several rural localities in Russia:
Batyrevo, Chuvash Republic, a selo in Batyrevskoye Rural Settlement of Batyrevsky District of the Chuvash Republic
Batyrevo, Kurgan Oblast, a selo in Yarovinsky Selsoviet of Polovinsky District of Kurgan Oblast
Batyrevo, Grakhovsky District, Udmurt Republic, a village in Loloshur-Vozzhinsky Selsoviet of Grakhovsky District of the Udmurt Republic
Batyrevo, Kiznersky District, Udmurt Republic, a village in Laka-Tyzhminsky Selsoviet of Kiznersky District of the Udmurt Republic